KSSN (95.7 FM) is a radio station located in Little Rock, Arkansas. The station broadcasts a country format and is under ownership of iHeartMedia, Inc.  The station's studios are located in West Little Rock, and the transmitter tower is located on Shinall Mountain, near the Chenal Valley neighborhood of Little Rock.

References

External links
 Kissin 96 Official Website
 

SSN
Country radio stations in the United States
Radio stations established in 1966
IHeartMedia radio stations
1966 establishments in Arkansas